Kosho may refer to:

Emperor Kōshō, the fifth imperial ruler of Japan to appear on the traditional list of emperors
Kōshō, a Japanese era spanning from 1455 to 1457
Kosho Shorei Ryu Kempo, a martial art system of Kenpo
Koshō, a premodern Japanese term for a page
Kosho, a branch of the Jodo Shinshu Buddhist tradition
Kōshō (crater), a crater on Mercury
Kosho, a fictional martial art portrayed in the cult TV series The Prisoner
kōshō seido, a wrestler ranking provision formerly used in professional sumo